John Carl  (May 28, 1854 – October 2, 1927) was an American baseball player.

Carl played in one game for the 1874 Baltimore Canaries of the National Association. He was 0-for-3 that day, and the Canaries lost to the New York Mutuals, 15-1, en route to 9-38 season, after which they folded.

Three years later, in 1877, Carl appeared in eight games for the Manchester, New Hampshire club of the International Association, a quasi-major league that featured many players that would later play in the real big leagues, including John O'Rourke, brother of "Orator" Jim O'Rourke. He managed three hits in 27 at bats for a .111 average.

John Carl died on October 2, 1927 in Baltimore, Maryland at the age of 73.

References

External links

1854 births
1927 deaths
Major League Baseball catchers
19th-century baseball players
Baltimore Canaries players
Baseball players from Baltimore
Manchester (minor league baseball) players